"Banga! Banga!" is a song by American singer Austin Mahone. The song features uncredited vocals by Sean Garrett who also co-wrote the song with Mahone and Menardini Timothee and co-produced it as well with Bridgetown. It was released as a single on November 10, 2013.

Composition

In an interview to Rolling Stone Mahone commented about the song: "This single is a little bit [more] mature. I'm turning 18 in a couple of months, so I'm just trying to make music that's [more] maturing." On November 3, 2013 he tweeted the single cover. The song was labeled by the same source as "primary color-pop rap pinned".

Music video
On November 6, 2013, Mahone announced that the official music video for the track was going to be shot the following week. It was premiered via Mahone's official VEVO channel on December 11, 2013, and directed by Gil Green.

Live performances
Austin Mahone performed the song the Nickelodeon HALO Awards on November 17, 2013.

Track list
Digital download
 "Banga! Banga!" – 3:15

Credits and personnel
 Lead vocals – Austin Mahone
 Lyrics – Austin Mahone, Sean Garrett, Menardini Timothee
 Engineer – Joshua Samuel
 Producers – Sean Garrett, Bridgetown
 Label: Chase, Cash Money Records

Charts

Release history

References

2013 singles
Austin Mahone songs
Songs written by Sean Garrett
2013 songs
Cash Money Records singles
Republic Records singles
Songs written by Austin Mahone